Gazireh may refer to :

 Gazireh (Turkey), a city in Turkey and 
 former Chaldean Catholic diocese Gazireh of the Chaldeans
 former Syrian Catholic diocese Gazireh of the Syrians
 former Latin Missio sui iuris of Gazireh 
 Gezir(eh), in Iran